ITPKC is one of 3 human genes that encode for an Inositol-trisphosphate 3-kinase.  This gene that has been associated with Kawasaki disease. Kawasaki disease is an acute febrile illness that involves the inflammation of blood vessels throughout the body. The majority of cases that have been diagnosed involve children under the age of 5. In untreated cases involving children, 15 to 25 percent of these cases developed coronary artery aneurysms. The overproduction of T cells may be correlated with the immune hyperactivity in Kawasaki disease.

This gene is located at chromosome 19q13.1, it codes for one of three isoenzymes. The other two enzymes being ITPKA and ITPKB. ITPKC is involved in the Ca(2+)/NFAT pathway, negatively regulating T cell activation.

A mutation in this gene occurs through a single-nucleotide polymorphism. When a mutation occurs the gene does not produce a functioning enzyme, meaning it will no longer be effective in negatively regulating T cells. When there is this reduced expression of the enzyme, ITPKC, there is a higher amount of IP3 which leads to the calcium channels being opened, and a higher amount of calcium being released. Leading to overly active T cells, and having this mutation in ITPKC is correlated to the increased risk of developing symptoms.

See also
 ITPR1
 Inositol triphosphate

References